The following structures have been called the Ninth Avenue Depot:
Ninth Avenue Depot (Brooklyn), at Ninth Avenue and 20th Street
Ninth Avenue Depot (Manhattan) or 54th Street Depot, at Ninth Avenue and 54th Street, demolished